Michael Joseph Brdar (born April 7, 1994) is an American professional baseball hitting coach for the Detroit Tigers of Major League Baseball (MLB). He has also coached in MLB for the San Diego Padres.

Career
Brdar attended De La Salle High School in Concord, California, and played for the school's baseball team. He enrolled at Diablo Valley College, where he began his college baseball career. He transferred to the University of Michigan to play for the Michigan Wolverines. The St. Louis Cardinals selected him in the 36th round of the 2017 MLB draft.

Following Brdar's playing career, he spent two seasons as the hitting coordinator for the San Francisco Giants organization. After the 2021 season, the San Diego Padres hired Brdar as their hitting coach. After one season with the Padres, the Detroit Tigers hired Brdar to be their hitting coach.

References

External links

Living people
1994 births
Detroit Tigers coaches
Diablo Valley Vikings baseball players
Gulf Coast Cardinals players
Michigan Wolverines baseball players
People from Concord, California
Major League Baseball hitting coaches
San Diego Padres coaches